participated in the Eurovision Song Contest 2009 with the song "This Is Our Night" written by Dimitris Kontopoulos, Craig Porteils and Cameron Giles-Webb and performed by Sakis Rouvas. To select their entry for the 2009 contest, which was held in Moscow, Russia, the Greek national broadcaster Hellenic Broadcasting Corporation (ERT) internally selected Rouvas, while his song was chosen through the televised national final Ellinikós Telikós 2009, which consisted of three candidate songs voted upon by the public and a jury.

Following the selection of the song, Rouvas began to travel around Europe and appeared on many television shows, including events held by other participants in the contest. Greece took part in the second semi-final of the contest on 14 May 2009 and qualified for the final, placing fourth with 110 points. At the final on 16 May, Rouvas performed "This Is Our Night" eighth out of the 25 participants and at the end of voting, was awarded seventh place, marking Greece's sixth consecutive top 10 placing since 2004.

Background

Prior to the 2009 contest, Greece had participated in the Eurovision Song Contest 29 times since its first entry in 1974. Following the introduction of semi-finals for the 2004 contest, Greece qualified for the final each year.

The Hellenic Broadcasting Corporation (ERT) broadcasts the event within Greece and organises the selection process for the nation's entry. For the Eurovision Song Contest 2009, ERT was able to secure a high-profile artist once again and planned a national final to choose the song.

Before Eurovision

Artist selection

On 15 July 2008, ERT confirmed Rouvas as the Greek representative for the Eurovision Song Contest 2009. Rouvas had previously represented Greece in the Eurovision Song Contest 2004, placing third, and had hosted the Eurovision Song Contest 2006 in the Greek capital Athens alongside Maria Menounos. ERT's Eurovision project manager Johnny Kalimeris stated that Rouvas' participation was announced so early because "there was no reason to keep it a secret [and that] it was about to leak [so they] decided to make a short announcement early on to avoid the usual speculations and rumours which could do more damage than good". Rouvas' selection made Greece the first nation to publicly announce their entrant for the 2009 contest.

Ellinikós Telikós 2009 

Following the announcement of Rouvas as their Eurovision Song Contest 2009 representative, ERT revealed during a press conference on 14 October 2009 that he would perform three songs, all written by Dimitris Kontopoulos and choreographed by Fokas Evangelinos, during a national final titled Ellinikós Telikós 2009 ("Greek final"). In regards to the style of the songs, Rouvas stated that he trusted Kontopoulos as he had written many hits for him in the past and knew the styles of songs that fit him best. The titles of the three songs were announced on 10 February 2009 and the songs in their entirety were presented during a press conference two days later at the Hilton Athens hotel. Alexandra Zakka wrote the lyrics for the first song, titled "Out of Control", a pop song with R&B elements, while Craig Porteils and Cameron Giles-Webb wrote the lyrics for both "Right On Time", a mid-tempo song, and "This Is Our Night", a dance song. Craig Porteils is a Greek Australian music producer who has written songs and lyrics for Cher, Billy Idol, Tevin Campbell, Guns N' Roses, Rod Stewart and Ozzy Osbourne among others, while Cameron Giles-Webb is another Greek Australian music producer who was the head of Gusto Music.

Final 
The final took place on 18 February 2009 at the Athinon Arena Music Hall in Athens, hosted by Betty and Mathilde Maggira. The show was directed by Giorgos Kapoutzidis and televised on ERT's NET channel as well as online via eurovision.ert.gr and the official Eurovision Song Contest website eurovision.tv. Elias Ledakis served as set designer, Giorgos Segredakis was responsible for the costume designs and Evangelinos served as the producer, choreographer and artistic supervisor of the evening. The show had a main concept of Eurovision history and included a flashback to the Eurovision world from the contest's origins in 1956 to the present. Rouvas performed all three songs and the winning song, "This Is Our Night", was selected by a combination of public voting (60%) and jury voting (40%). The jury consisted of Mimis Plessas (composer and jury president), Dimitris Gontikas (General Manager of ERT Television), Antonis Andrikakis (lyricist and General Manager of ERT Radio), Evangelia Piskera (Director of ERT Public Relations), Olga Pavlatou (record executive), Giorgos Kyvelos (record producer) and a seventh press vote by Stella Floras consisting of the results from a poll conducted by Eurovision news website ESCToday that featured international Eurovision fans. Only the winning song "This is Our Night" was announced, though ESCToday later revealed their portion of the vote as "This Is Our Night" with 61.18%, "Out of Control" with 25.88% and "Right on Time" with 12.94%.

In addition to the performances of the competing entries, the interval acts featured guest performances by Eurovision Song Contest 2009 participants from Belarus (Petr Elfimov), Cyprus (Christina Metaxa), Malta (Chiara), Montenegro (Andrea Demirović), Turkey (Hadise) and the UK (Jade Ewen), as well as Greece's 2008 representative Kalomira.

Promotion
Following the national final, initial plans for an extensive promotional tour for "This Is Our Night" were announced. The first official stop after the selection was to Bosnia and Herzegovina where Rouvas performed at the official presentation of the nation's entry "Bistra Voda" on 1 March 2009. Other guests included Turkey and Malta. Rouvas was then a guest at the Pink TV BH Morning Show which aired live on Balkan Net, and also appeared on the live radio show Stari Grad. He also gave interviews to TV Hayat, the Obavezan smjer show on TV Sarajevo, and on the Radio Televizija BiH show Konacno petak. Following his two-day stay in Bosnia and Herzegovina, Rouvas returned to Belgrade, Serbia, where he would stay until 4 March 2009, appearing on Fox TV, Radio S, TV S, TV Avala and Pink TV. On 4 March he was a special guest of Jovana Janković, the hostess of the Eurovision Song Contest 2008, on the RTS Morning Show. Rouvas concluded his promotion in Serbia with a live appearance on Novi SAT channel. Rouvas then flew to Moscow, where he performed live at the Russian National Final along with past Russian representatives, namely Dima Bilan, Yulia Savicheva, Alsou, Youddiph, Natalia Podolskaya, Prime Minister and Serebro. The next day he performed at the Kremlin for the celebration of International Woman's Day in Russia. Rouvas also appeared at a concert in Cyprus on 13 March 2009 and continued promotion in Turkey from 10 to 12 April. 

A music video for "This is Our Night" was also released to promote the entry. The video was directed by Ukrainian Katya Tsaryk and choreographed by Fokas Evangelinos. Filming took place over a period of two days, concluding on 24 February 2009. Filming locations included the Starz club and King George hotel as well as outdoor locations around Athens.

At Eurovision
The Eurovision Song Contest 2009 took place at the Olympic Stadium in Moscow, Russia and consisted of two semi-finals held on 12 and 14 May, respectively, and the final on 16 May 2009. On 30 January 2009, an allocation draw was held that placed each country into one of the two semi-finals, with Greece being placed into the second semi-final, to be held on 14 May. Once all the competing songs for the contest had been released, the running order for the semi-finals was decided by the delegation heads of the 42 participating countries; Greece was set to perform 13th in the field of 19, following  and preceding . The two semi-finals and the final were broadcast in Greece on ERT with television commentary by the Maggira sisters and radio commentary by Maria Kozakou.

Performances
Fokas Evangelinos and Elias Ledakis were the choreographers and artistic directors of Rouvas' stage show. Evangelinos had choreographed Rouvas' third place 2004 entry, Helena Paparizou's winning 2005 entry, the opening ceremony of the Eurovision Song Contest 2006, Ani Lorak's second place 2008 entry, and Dima Bilan's second place entry in 2006 and winning 2008 entry among others. The performance included complex choreography, with Richard Galpin of BBC News remarking that "Greece's Sakis Rouvas had one of the more ambitious dance routines" of the contest. Rouvas performed on a rotating podium which transported him from left to right across the stage and partook in a group dance routine with four other performers, who in the end, were responsible for lifting him into the air. As he was lifted, a Greek flag was displayed on the floor, only visible to the television viewers. The final part of the performance was completed by silver fireworks in two separate parts. The EBU noted that Greece had made "high-tech advancements" in the contest's standards based on the year's performance.

After the semi-final, "This is Our Night" was one of the 10 performances which qualified for the final. The nation finished in fourth place, receiving 110 points. BBC News noted that bookmakers Ladbrokes showed the song as being a likely second place finisher behind Norway. In the final, on 16 May 2009, "This Is Our Night" was performed eighth in the running order out of the 25 participants. The song therefore carried on Greece's Eurovision success by finishing within the top-ten for the sixth consecutive year. The event was watched by 86% of the Greek television audience.

Whilst Rouvas was disappointed with his seventh-place finish, announcing to Greek media "I am so sorry, I wanted us to win", there was still support towards the artist himself in the country. "Seventh in Europe, first in our hearts", many journalists reported on Greek television. The media and public pronounced their support for Rouvas, the general consensus being that the artist gave it his best even though this did not translate in enough votes in the contest. Rouvas stated that, overall, it was a wonderful experience for him: "Some win, some lose, personally, I gave everything I had. But it was a wonderful experience." Some critics, including those from Global Greek Radio, suggested the reason why Greece failed to achieve a higher placing was due to a lack of an ethnic-sounding song. They noted the way in which all of Greece's top-three placings, including Rovas' performance of "Shake It" in 2004, had an ethnic bouzouki sound, as did the 2009 Azerbaijani and Turkish entries which finished in third and fourth place respectively.

Voting 
Voting during the three shows involved each country awarding points from 1-8, 10 and 12 as determined by televoting in the semi-final and a combination of 50% national jury and 50% televoting in the final. Each nation's jury consisted of five music industry professionals who are citizens of the country they represent. This jury judged each entry based on: vocal capacity; the stage performance; the song's composition and originality; and the overall impression by the act. In addition, no member of a national jury was permitted to be related in any way to any of the competing acts in such a way that they cannot vote impartially and independently. Greece received the top 12 points from Albania and Cyprus in the second semi-final, and from Albania, Bulgaria and Cyprus in the final. Greece awarded its 12 points to Cyprus in the semi-final and to the UK in the final. The tables below visualise a complete breakdown of points awarded to Greece in both the second semi-final and the final of the Eurovision Song Contest 2009, as well as by the country on both occasions.

Points awarded to Greece

Points awarded by Greece

Detailed voting results

References

External links 
 ERT's Eurovision Website

2009
Countries in the Eurovision Song Contest 2009
Eurovision
Eurovision